Tonna boucheti is a species of large sea snail, a marine gastropod mollusk in the family Tonnidae, the tun shells.

Description

Distribution
This species occurs in the Pacific Ocean off Taiwan.

References

 Vos C. (2005) Notes on Tonnidae of the T. variegata complex and T. chinensis complex, with descriptions of four new species (Gastropoda: Tonnidae). Visaya 1(5): 45-62. [November 2005] page(s): 50
 Vos, C. (2007) A conchological Iconography (No. 13) - The family Tonnidae. 123 pp., 30 numb. plus 41 (1 col.) un-numb. text-figs, 33 maps., 63 col. pls, Conchbooks, Germany
 Vos, C. (2012) Overview of the Tonnidae (MOLLUSCA: GASTROPODA) in Chinese waters. Shell Discoveries 1(1); pp. 12-22; Pls. 1-9
 Vos, C. (2013) Overview of the Tonnidae (Mollusca: Gastropoda) in Chinese waters. Gloria Maris 52(1-2); pp. 22-53; Pls. 1-9

External links
 Gastropods.com : Tonna (Variegata complex) boucheti; accessed : 26 April 2011

Tonnidae
Gastropods described in 2005